The Partit Nacionalista Occitan, more simply, "PNO" (in English: Occitan Nationalist Party) is a political party of Occitania, founded in 1959 by François Fontan (1929–1979). The current name is "Partit de la Nacion Occitana" (in English: "Occitan Nation Party").

François Fontan and the Ethnism 

Author of "Ethnism" (in French : "Ethnisme"), François Fontan argues that the language is indicating the nation. Thus, Occitan nationalism draws its sources from the Félibrige of Frederic Mistral, who since the second half of the 19th century worked for the recognition of the Occitan language in the southern part of France: before that, "la langue d'oc" was just considered as a degenerate form of French ("patois"). Then, the Occitan national conscience has woken up from the feeling of speaking a vernacular language different from the French administrative language. Fontan tried to proclaim an Occitan Republic for the first time in Agen in 1948.

The Occitan flag 

The Cross of Toulouse (Arms of the medieval Counts of Toulouse) is used to symbolize the South French region of Occitania. For the Occitan national flag, François Fontan proposes to associate a star with 7 points, reference to the Félibrige who already used this symbol ("Lo Lugarn") with this number "7" for the 7 Occitans poets "Félibres" founders of this movement. In fact, Occitania is also divided into 7 historical counties too: Guyenne, Gascony, Provence, Dauphiné, Auvergne, Limousin, Languedoc.

The Occitan Nation Party at the elections 

The PNO regularly presents lists or candidates for the elections, mainly in France, where Occitan is most spoken. In 1974, the PNO had supported the candidacy of the federalist Guy Héraud in the presidential election. Guy Héraud, co-author of "Ethnism" with his friend François Fontan, gets less than 0.08% of the votes, the lowest score ever obtained by a candidate in a French presidential election. In 2004, the regionalist list led by Christian Lacour obtained 1.27% in the region Languedoc-Roussillon. The candidature PNO in the parliamentary elections of 2007 got 0.42% of the votes on the 8th constituency of Haute-Garonne and 0,79% (with Bastir Occitània) in the parliamentary elections of 2017. The PNO obtained its best results at the municipal elections, in 1978 in Fraisse (Italy) or in 2014 in France (with the regionalist movement "Bastir!").

References

External links
François Fontan
The Félibrige
Occitania
Bastir!

Occitania
Nationalist parties in Europe
Occitan nationalism
Political parties established in 1959
Nationalist parties in France
Political parties in France
Political parties in Occitania
Occitania